Dourif is a surname. Notable people with the surname include:

 Brad Dourif (born 1950), American film and television actor
 Fiona Dourif (born 1981), American actress and producer, daughter of Brad